These are term limited and retiring members of the House of Representatives of the Philippines during the 18th Congress of the Philippines, who cannot or would not run in the 2022 elections.

In the Philippines, members of the House of Representatives cannot serve more than four consecutive terms. Term limited members are prohibited from running in the 2022 elections; they may run for any other positions, or may wait until the 2025 elections, or in a special election.

Summary 
There are 304 seats in the House of Representatives' delegation to the outgoing 18th Congress of the Philippines, of which 67 of these are open seats, with an additional five vacancies that have not been filled up due to lack of special elections.

Term-limited members 
These are on their third consecutive term already and cannot run for reelection.

Aksyon incumbents 

 Edgar Erice (Caloocan–2nd), running for mayor of Caloocan
 By July 2021, it was rumored that Erice was likely to run for mayor of Caloocan. Days later, Erice announced that he would indeed run for mayor.

Lakas incumbents 

 Fredenil Castro (Capiz–2nd), running for governor of Capiz

LDP incumbents 

 Rodrigo Abellanosa (Cebu City–2nd)
 By March 2020, Abellanosa was said to be eyeing to run for mayor of Cebu City, or not run in 2022. Over a year later, Bando Osmeña – Pundok Kauswagan (BO-PK) was reportedly eyeing him to either run for mayor or vice mayor. Abellanosa ultimately was not included in BO-PK's local slate.

Liberal incumbents 

 Kit Belmonte (Quezon City–6th)
 Francis Gerald Abaya (Cavite–1st)
 Isagani Amatong (Zamboanga del Norte–3rd)

Mindoro Bago Sarili incumbents 
 Paulino Salvador Leachon (Oriental Mindoro–1st), running for governor of Oriental Mindoro

Nacionalista incumbents 

 Raneo Abu (Batangas–2nd)
 Sol Aragones (Laguna–3rd), running for governor of Laguna
 Abdulmunir Mundoc Arbison (Sulu–2nd)
 Mercedes Cagas (Davao del Sur)
 Eileen Ermita-Buhain (Batangas–1st)
 Ermita-Buhain is retiring.
 Jun Chipeco Jr. (Calamba)
 Lawrence Fortun (Agusan del Norte–1st), running for vice mayor of Butuan
 Jeffrey Khonghun (Zambales–1st), mayor of Castillejos, Zambales
 Jose I. Tejada (Cotabato–3rd)

NPC incumbents 

 Erico Aristotle Aumentado (Bohol–2nd), running for governor of Bohol
 It was speculated that Aumentado would run for governor of Bohol, while his wife sought to replace him as congressman from the third district. Aumentado did file to run for governor, and his wife also filed for the House seat he is term-limited as representative.
 Cheryl Deloso-Montalla (Zambales–2nd), running for governor of Zambales
 Abdullah Dimaporo (Lanao del Norte–2nd)
 Evelina Escudero (Sorsogon–1st)
 Angelina Tan (Quezon–4th), running for governor of Quezon
 In April 2021, Tan said that she was "99.99% ready" to run for governor of Quezon. She indeed ended up running for governor.
 Noel Villanueva (Tarlac–3rd), running for mayor of Concepcion, Tarlac

NUP incumbents 

 Alex Advincula (Cavite–3rd), running for mayor of Imus, Cavite
 Franz Alvarez (Palawan–1st)
 Wilfredo Caminero (Cebu–2nd), running for mayor of Argao, Cebu
 Leo Rafael Cueva (Negros Occidental–2nd), running for mayor of Sagay, Negros Occidental
 Luis Ferrer IV (Cavite–6th), running for mayor of General Trias, Cavite
Gavini Pancho (Bulacan–2nd)
 Abraham Tolentino (Cavite–8th), running for mayor of Tagaytay, Cavite
 Juliette Uy (Misamis Oriental–2nd), running for governor of Misamis Oriental
 Rolando Uy (Cagayan de Oro–1st), running for mayor of Cagayan de Oro
 By January 2020, Uy was seen as a leading candidate for mayor of Cagayan de Oro if he ran. Uy did file to run for mayor.

PDP–Laban incumbents 

 Benjamin Agarao Jr. (Laguna–4th), running for mayor of Santa Cruz, Laguna
 Rose Marie Arenas (Pangasinan–3rd)
Arenas is not running in 2022.
 Ferdinand Hernandez (South Cotabato–2nd), running for governor of South Cotabato
 Dulce Ann Hofer (Zamboanga Sibugay–2nd), running for governor of Zamboanga Sibugay
 Elisa Olga Kho (Masbate–2nd), running for vice governor of Masbate
 Eric Olivarez (Parañaque–1st), running for mayor of Parañaque
 Xavier Jesus Romualdo (Camiguin), running for governor of Camiguin
 Estrellita Suansing (Nueva Ecija–1st)
 Lucy Torres (Leyte–4th), running for mayor of Ormoc
 Torres was originally rumored to run for senator. However, she and her husband Ormoc mayor Richard Gomez's local organization announced that she is running for mayor, and he for the open congressional seat.
 Alfred Vargas (Quezon City–5th). running for councilor of Quezon City from the fifth district
 Vargas did not continue his run for the Senate, and was originally planning to return to private life after his third term ends. His brother, Quezon City councilor Patrick Michael, is running for the open seat in his place. He later changed his mind, running for Quezon City councilor.
 Ronaldo Zamora (San Juan)
 San Juan Mayor Francis Zamora said that his father would "be retiring definitely".

PRP incumbents 
 Rogelio Neil Roque (Bukidnon–4th), running for governor of Bukidnon

Party-list incumbents 
 Lito Atienza (Buhay), running for vice president of the Philippines.
 Conrado Estrella III (Abono)
 Rico Geron (AGAP)
 Joseph Stephen Paduano (Abang Lingkod)
 Carlos Isagani Zarate (Bayan Muna)

Retiring incumbents 
These were allowed defend their seats, but chose not to:

Aksyon incumbents 

 Esmael Mangudadatu (Maguindanao–2nd), running for governor of Maguindanao

Asenso Manileño incumbents 
 Yul Servo (Manila–3rd), running for vice mayor of Manila

Independent incumbents 
 Alan Peter Cayetano (Taguig-Pateros–1st), running for senator

Lakas incumbents 

 Mikey Arroyo (Pampanga–2nd)
 Arroyo is retiring.
 Ramon Guico III (Pangasinan–5th), running for governor of Pangasinan
Wilter Palma II, (Zamboanga Sibugay–1st) running for governor of Zamboanga Sibugay

Nacionalista incumbents 
Braeden John Biron (Iloilo–4th), running for mayor of Dumangas, Iloilo
Lani Cayetano (Taguig–2nd), running for mayor of Taguig
Eduardo Gullas (Cebu–1st)
Gullas is retiring from politics.
Corazon Nuñez Malanyaon (Davao Oriental–1st), running for governor of Davao Oriental
Vilma Santos (Batangas–6th)
Vilma Santos was eyed to run for president by the 1Sambayan convenors' group, but she declined. Her husband, Senator Ralph Recto, said on 2021 that he was mulling to swap positions with her. Recto did file to run for Santos's open seat. In her Facebook post, she announced that she no longer ran for's any elective positions.
 Frederick Siao (Iligan), running for mayor of Iligan

Navoteño incumbents 
 John Rey Tiangco (Navotas), running for mayor of Navotas

NPC incumbents 
 Lorna Bautista-Bandigan (Davao Occidental), running for vice governor of Davao Occidental
 Bayani Fernando (Marikina–1st), mayor of Marikina
 Josal Fortuno (Camarines Sur–5th)
 Not running in 2022.
 Weslie Gatchalian (Valenzuela–1st), running for mayor of Valenzuela
 Loren Legarda (Antique), running for senator.
 Dahlia Loyola (Cavite–5th), running for mayor of Carmona, Cavite.

NUP incumbents 
 Narciso Bravo Jr. (Masbate–1st), running for governor of Masbate
 Strike Revilla (Cavite–2nd), running for mayor of Bacoor, Cavite

PDP–Laban incumbents 
 Angelica Amante (Agusan del Norte–2nd), running for governor of Agusan del Norte
 Shirlyn Banas-Nograles (South Cotabato–1st), running for mayor of General Santos
 Ruffy Biazon (Muntinlupa), running for mayor of Muntinlupa
 Biazon is running under the One Muntinlupa local party.
 Joet Garcia (Bataan–2nd), running for governor of Bataan
 Dale Malapitan (Caloocan–1st), running for mayor of Caloocan
 Rogelio Pacquiao (Sarangani), running for governor of Sarangani
Joy Tambunting (Parañaque–2nd)
Tambunting is not running in 2022.
Sharee Ann Tan (Samar–2nd), running for governor of Samar

Party-list incumbents 
For party-list incumbents, they are expected to serve out their terms unless expelled by their parties or they resign, as they are not able to run under their party-list's name in non-party-list elections.
 Eufemia Cullamat (Bayan Muna)
 Cullamat did not seek a second term.
 Mike Defensor (Anakalusugan), running for mayor of Quezon City
 Defensor is running under the Partido Federal ng Pilipinas.
 Alfredo Garbin Jr. (Ako Bicol), running for mayor of Legazpi, Albay
 Garbin was nominated by the Nationalist People's Coalition and Lakas–CMD.
 Sarah Elago (Kabataan)
 Elago is retiring since she reached the age limit of 30 for youth sector representatives.
 Rodante Marcoleta (SAGIP), running for senator
 Marcoleta is running under PDP–Laban.
Jose Singson Jr. (Probinsyano Ako), running for mayor of Vigan, Ilocos Sur
 Singson is running under the Nationalist People's Coalition.

References 

2022 Philippine general election